is a train station in Kurashiki, Okayama Prefecture, Japan.

History 
Kimi station opened on 20 March 1988.

Lines
West Japan Railway Company
Honshi-Bisan Line

References 

Railway stations in Okayama Prefecture
Stations of West Japan Railway Company